These are the squads for the countries that played in the 1925 South American Championship. The participating countries were Argentina, Brazil and Paraguay. The teams plays in a single round-robin tournament, earning two points for a win, one point for a draw, and zero points for a loss.

Argentina
Head Coach:  Américo Tesoriere

Brazil
Head Coach:  Ramón Platero

Paraguay
Head Coach:  Manuel Fleitas Solich

References

External links 
RSSSF South American Championship squads

Squads
Copa América squads